Growth factor receptor-bound protein 10 also known as insulin receptor-binding protein Grb-IR is a protein that in humans is encoded by the GRB10 gene.

Function 
The product of this gene belongs to a small family of adaptor proteins that are known to interact with a number of receptor tyrosine kinases and signaling molecules. This gene encodes a growth factor receptor-binding protein that interacts with insulin receptors and insulin-like growth-factor receptors (e.g., IGF1R and IGF2R). Overexpression of some isoforms of the encoded protein inhibits tyrosine kinase activity and results in growth suppression. This gene is imprinted in a highly isoform- and tissue-specific manner. Alternatively spliced transcript variants encoding different isoforms have been identified.

Animal studies 
Mice whose paternally inherited Grb10 gene is inactivated are more aggressive while those whose maternally inherited allele is inactivated exhibit foetal overgrowth and are significantly bigger than wild-type litter-mates.

Interactions
GRB10 has been shown to interact with 
  Abl gene,
 BCR gene,
 C-Raf,
 c-Kit,
 Insulin receptor,>
 Insulin-like growth factor 1 receptor,
 MAP2K1, and
 RET proto-oncogene.

References

Further reading

External links